Noh Woo-jin (born June 27, 1980), is a South Korean comedian. He was a former cast member in the variety show Law of the Jungle.

Filmography

Film

Variety show

References 

1980 births
Living people
South Korean male comedians
South Korean television personalities
Jeonju University alumni
Gag Concert